THeMIS (Tracked Hybrid Modular Infantry System), unmanned ground vehicle (UGV), is a ground-based armed drone vehicle designed largely for military applications, and is built by Milrem Robotics in Estonia. The vehicle is intended to provide support for dismounted troops by serving as a transport platform, remote weapon station, IED detection and disposal unit etc.

Capability 
The vehicle’s open architecture gives it multi-missions capability. The main purpose of the THeMIS Transport is to support onbase logistics and provide last mile resupply for fighting units on the front line. It supports infantry units by reducing their physical and cognitive load, increasing stand-off distance, force protection and survivability. THeMIS Combat UGVs provide direct fire support for manoeuvre forces acting as a force multiplier. With an integrated self-stabilizing remote-controlled weapon system, they provide high precision over wide areas, day and night, increasing stand-off distance, force protection and survivability. Combat UGVs can be equipped with light or heavy machine guns, 40 mm grenade launchers, 30mm autocannons and Anti-Tank Missile Systems. THeMIS ISR UGVs have advanced multi-sensor intelligence gathering capabilities. Their main purpose is to increase situational awareness, provide improved intelligence, surveillance and reconnaissance over wide areas and battle damage assessment capability. The system can effectively enhance the work of dismounted infantry units, border guard and law enforcement agencies to collect and process raw information and decrease the reaction time for commanders.  THeMIS is capable of firing conventional machine gun ammunition or missile rounds

History 

On 29th September 2020, Estonia and the Netherlands officially announced that they are jointly acquiring 7 THeMIS UGVs. Both nations' armies have previously tested the system extensively.

On 6th September 2022, Milrem Robotics delivered the THeMIS UGVs suited for casualty evacuation (CASEVAC) and transportation of supplies to Ukraine. On November 22, 2022, German Ministry of Defense through Krauss-Maffei Wegmann (KMW) has signed a contract to deliver another 14 THeMIS unmanned ground vehicles (UGV) to Ukraine.

The system has been exported to several NATO members and allies, including Australia, France, Germany, the Netherlands, Norway, the UK, Ukraine, and the US.

Operators 

 Estonian Defence Forces

 Royal Netherlands Army

 Armed Forces of Ukraine
 
 Indian Armed Forces
 
 Spanish Armed Forces, first unit received in August 2022.
 
 Royal Thai Army

See also 
 Type-X, Milrem's 12-tonne robotic combat vehicle

References

 
Unmanned ground combat vehicles